Bror Munchk may refer to:
Bror Munck (born 1799), Swedish military officer and nobility
Bror Munck (born 1857), Swedish military officer and nobility